Be Careful What You Wish For is an English phrase. It may also refer to:

Books
 Be Careful What You Wish For... (novella), the twelfth book in R.L. Stine's Goosebumps series
 Be Careful What You Wish For (Potter novel), by Alexandra Potter
 Be Careful What You Wish For (Archer novel), by Jeffrey Archer

Music

Albums
 Be Careful What You Wish For..., by Gabby La La
 Be Careful What You Wish For (AKA & Anatii album), 2017 
 Be Careful What You Wish For (Ramleh album), 1995

Songs
 "Be Careful What You Wish For", by Luke Combs from the album This One's for You
 "Be Careful What You Wish For", by Noel Gallagher's High Flying Birds from the album Who Built the Moon?, 2017

Film and television 
 "Be Careful What You Wish For" (Cow and Chicken), a 1998 television episode
 Be Careful What You Wish For, a working title of 2007 film How I Married My High School Crush
 "Be Careful What You Wish For" (Dawson's Creek), television episode

See also 
 Careful What You Wish For (film), 2015
 Be Careful What You Don't Wish For, album by Twelve
 "Be Careful What You Fish For", episode of Family Guy
 "Be Careful What You Witch For", episode of Charmed